Wetton may refer to:

People with the surname
John Wetton (1949–2017), bass guitarist and singer-songwriter
Hilary Davan Wetton (born 1943), British conductor
Ralph Wetton (born 1927), English footballer

Places
Wetton, Staffordshire, a village in England
Wetton, Cape Town, a suburb of Cape Town, South Africa